Murrells is a surname. Notable people with the surname include: 

Frank Murrells (1902–2000), Australian footballer 
Steve Murrells (born 1965), British businessman, chief executive of The Co-operative Group

Other
Murrell (disambiguation)
Murrells Inlet, South Carolina, US town